Orthogonius senegalensis is a species of ground beetle in the subfamily Orthogoniinae. It was described by Pierre François Marie Auguste Dejean in 1831.

References

senegalensis
Beetles described in 1831